The 1874–75 United States House of Representatives elections were held on various dates in various states between June 1, 1874 and September 7, 1875. Each state set its own date for its elections to the House of Representatives before the first session of the 44th United States Congress convened on December 6, 1875. Elections were held for all 292 seats, representing 37 states.

These elections were held in the middle of President Ulysses S. Grant's second term with a deep economic depression underway. It was an important turning point, as the Republicans lost heavily and the Democrats gained control of the House. It signaled the imminent end of Reconstruction, which Democrats opposed.  Historians emphasize the factors of economic depression and attacks on the Grant administration for corruption as key factors in the vote.

With the election following the Panic of 1873, Grant's Republican Party was crushed in the elections, losing their majority and almost half their seats to the Democratic Party. This was the first period of Democratic control since the pre-war era.  The economic crisis and the inability of Grant to find a solution led to his party's defeat. This was the second-largest swing in the history of the House (only behind the 1894 elections), and is the largest House loss in the history of the Republican Party.

In the south, the Democrats continued their systematic destruction of the Republican coalition. In the South, Scalawags moved into the Democratic Party. The Democratic landslide signaled the imminent end of Reconstruction, which Democrats opposed and a realignment of the Republican coalition that had dominated American politics since the late 1850s.

While the ongoing end of Reconstruction in the South was one of the main reasons for the shift, turn-of-the-century historian James Ford Rhodes explored the multiple causes of the results in the North:

Rhodes continues:

The political revolution from 1872 to 1874 was due to the failure of the Southern policy of the Republican party, to the Credit Mobilier and Sanborn contract scandals, to corrupt and inefficient administration in many departments and to the persistent advocacy of Grant by some close friends and hangers-on for a third presidential term. Some among the opposition were influenced by the President's backsliding in the cause of civil service reform, and others by the failure of the Republican party to grapple successfully with the financial question. The depression, following the financial Panic of 1873, and the number of men consequently out of employment weighed in the scale against the party in power. In Ohio, the result was affected by the temperance crusade in the early part of the year. Bands of women of good social standing marched to saloons before which or in which they sang hymns and, kneeling down, prayed that the great evil of drink might be removed. Sympathizing men wrought with them in causing the strict law of the State against the sale of strong liquor to be rigidly enforced. Since Republicans were in the main the instigators of the movement, it alienated from their party a large portion of the German American vote.

Special elections 

 : 1874
 : 1874
 : 1875
 : 1875

Election summaries

Election dates

In 1845, Congress passed a law providing for a uniform nationwide date for choosing Presidential electors.  This law did not affect election dates for Congress, which remained within the jurisdiction of State governments, but over time, the states moved their congressional elections to this date as well.  In 1874–75, there were still 10 states with earlier election dates, and 3 states with later election dates:

Early elections (1874):
June 1 Oregon
August 6 North Carolina
September 1 Vermont
September 14 Maine
October 7 Georgia
October 13 Indiana, Iowa, Nebraska, Ohio, West Virginia
Late elections (1875):
March 9, 1875 New Hampshire
April 5, 1875 Connecticut
September 7, 1875 California

Alabama

Arkansas

Arizona Territory 
See Non-voting delegates, below.

California 

|-
! 
| Charles Clayton
|  | Republican
| 1872
| |  Incumbent retired.New member elected.Democratic gain.
| nowrap | 

|-
! 
| Horace F. Page
|  | Republican
| 1872
| Incumbent re-elected.
| nowrap | 

|-
! 
| John K. Luttrell
|  | Democratic
| 1872
| Incumbent re-elected.
| nowrap | 

|-
! 
| Sherman O. Houghton
|  | Republican
| 1871
| |  Lost re-electionDemocratic gain
| nowrap | 

|}

Colorado Territory 
See Non-voting delegates, below.

Connecticut

Delaware

Florida 

|-
! 
| William J. Purman
|  | Republican
| 1872
| Incumbent re-elected.
| nowrap | 

|-
! 
| Josiah T. Walls
|  | Republican
| 1870
| Incumbent re-elected.The election was later successfully challenged.
| nowrap | 

|}

Georgia

Idaho Territory 
See Non-voting delegates, below.

Illinois

Indiana

Iowa Territory 
See Non-voting delegates, below.

Kansas

Kentucky

Louisiana

Maine

Maryland

Massachusetts 

|-
! 
| James Buffinton
|  | Republican
| 1868
| Incumbent re-elected.
| nowrap | 

|-
! 
| Benjamin W. Harris
|  | Republican
| 1872
| Incumbent re-elected.
| nowrap | 

|-
! 
| William Whiting II
|  | Republican
| 1872
|  |Incumbent retired.New member elected.Republican hold.
| nowrap | 

|-
! 
| Samuel Hooper
|  | Republican
| 1861 (special)
|  |Incumbent retired.New member elected after initial result overturned.Democratic gain.
| nowrap | 

|-
! 
| Daniel W. Gooch
|  | Republican
| 1872
|  |Incumbent lost re-election.New member elected.Independent gain. 
| nowrap | 

|-
! 
| Benjamin Butler
|  | Republican
| 1866
|  |Incumbent lost re-election.New member elected.Democratic gain.
| nowrap | 

|-
! 
| Ebenezer R. Hoar
|  | Republican
| 1872
|  | Incumbent retired.New member elected.Democratic gain.
| nowrap | 
|-
! 
| John M. S. Williams
|  | Republican
| 1872
|  | Incumbent lost re-election.New member elected.Democratic gain.
| nowrap | 

|-
! 
| George F. Hoar
|  | Republican
| 1868
| Incumbent re-elected.
| nowrap | 

|-
! 
| Alvah Crocker
|  | Republican
| Jan. 1872 (special)
|  |Incumbent retired.New member elected.Independent gain.
| nowrap | 

|-
! 
| Henry L. Dawes
|  | Republican
| 1856
|  |Incumbent retired to run for U.S. Senate.New member elected.Democratic gain.
| nowrap | 
|}

Michigan

Minnesota

Mississippi 

|-
! 
| Lucius Q. C. Lamar
|  | Democratic
| 1872
| Incumbent re-elected.
| nowrap | 

|-
! 
| Albert R. Howe
|  | Republican
| 1872
|  | Incumbent lost re-election.New member elected.Independent Republican gain.
| nowrap | 

|-
! 
| Henry W. Barry
|  | Republican
| 1869
|  | Incumbent retired.New member elected.Democratic gain.
| nowrap | 

|-
! 
| Jason Niles
|  | Republican
| 1872
|  | Incumbent lost re-election.New member elected.Democratic gain.
| nowrap | 

|-
! 
| George C. McKee
|  | Republican
| 1869
|  | Incumbent retired.New member elected.Democratic gain.
| nowrap | 

|-
! 
| John R. Lynch
|  | Republican
| 1872
| Incumbent re-elected.
| nowrap | 

|}

Missouri

Montana Territory 
See Non-voting delegates, below.

Nebraska 

|-
! 
| Lorenzo Crounse
|  | Republican 
| 1872
| Incumbent re-elected.
| nowrap | 

|}

Nevada

New Hampshire

New Jersey

New Mexico Territory 
See Non-voting delegates, below.

New York

North Carolina

Ohio

Oregon

Pennsylvania

Rhode Island

South Carolina 

|-
! 
| Joseph Rainey
|  | Republican
| 1870 
| Incumbent re-elected.
| nowrap | 

|-
! 
| Alonzo J. Ransier
|  | Republican
| 1872
|  | Incumbent retired.New member elected.Independent Republican gain.Election was later successfully challenged, declared vacant, and a special election was then held.
| nowrap | 

|-
! 
| Robert B. Elliott
|  | Republican
| 1870
|  | Incumbent resigned November 1, 1874, to serve as sheriff.new member elected.Republican hold
| nowrap | 

|-
! 
| Alexander S. Wallace
|  | Republican
| 1868
| Incumbent re-elected.
| nowrap | 

|-
! 
| Richard H. Cain
|  | Republican
| 1872
|  | Incumbent retired.New member elected.Republican hold.
| nowrap | 

|}

Tennessee 

|-
! 
| Roderick R. Butler
|  | Republican 
| 1867
|  |Incumbent lost re-election.New member elected.Democratic gain.
| nowrap | 

|-
! 
| Jacob M. Thornburgh
|  | Republican
| 1872
| Incumbent re-elected.
| nowrap | 

|-
! 
| William Crutchfield
|  | Republican
| 1872
|  |Incumbent retired.New member elected.Democratic gain.
| nowrap | 

|-
! 
| John M. Bright
|  | Democratic
| 1870
|  |Incumbent redistricted to the .New member elected.Democratic hold.
|  nowrap | 

|-
! rowspan=2 | 
| Horace Harrison
|  | Republican
| 1872
|  |Incumbent redistricted to the .New member elected.Democratic gain.
| rowspan=2 nowrap | 
|-
| John M. Bright
|  | Democratic
| 1870

|-
! rowspan=2 | 
| Washington C. Whitthorne
|  | Democratic
| 1870
|  |Incumbent redistricted to the .New member elected.Democratic hold.
| rowspan=2 nowrap | 
|- 
| Horace Harrison
|  | Republican
| 1872

|-
! rowspan=2 | 
| John D. C. Atkins
|  | Democratic
| 1872
|  |Incumbent redistricted to the .New member elected.Democratic hold.
| nowrap rowspan=2 | 
|-
| Washington C. Whitthorne
|  | Democratic
| 1870
| Redistricted from the 

|-
! rowspan=2 | 
| David A. Nunn
|  | Republican
| 1872
|  |Incumbent redistricted to the .New member elected.Democratic gain.
| nowrap rowspan=2 | 
|-
| John D. C. Atkins
|  | Democratic
| 1872

|-
! rowspan=2 | 
| Barbour Lewis
|  | Republican
| 1872
|  |Incumbent redistricted to the .New member elected.Democratic gain.
| nowrap rowspan=2 | 
|-
| David A. Nunn
|  | Republican
| 1872

|-
! 
| Barbour Lewis
|  | Republican
| 1872
|  |Incumbent redistricted from the .New member elected.Democratic gain.
| 

|}

Texas

Utah Territory 
See Non-voting delegates, below.

Vermont

Virginia

Washington Territory 
See Non-voting delegates, below.

West Virginia 

|-
! 
| John J. Davis
|  | Independent Democratic
| 1870
|  | Incumbent retired.New member elected.Democratic gain.
| nowrap | 

|-
! 
| John Hagans
|  | Republican
| 1872
|  | Incumbent lost re-election as an Independent.New member elected.Democratic gain.
| nowrap | 

|-
! 
| Frank Hereford
|  | Democratic
| 1870
| Incumbent re-elected.
| nowrap | 

|}

Wisconsin

|-
! 
| Charles G. Williams
|  | Republican
| 1872
| Incumbent re-elected.
| nowrap | 

|-
! 
| Gerry Whiting Hazelton
|  | Republican
| 1870
|  | Incumbent retired.New member elected.Republican hold.
| nowrap | 

|-
! 
| J. Allen Barber
|  | Republican
| 1870
|  | Incumbent retired.New member elected. Republican hold.
| nowrap | 

|-
! 
| Alexander Mitchell
|  | Democratic
| 1870
|  | Incumbent retired.new member elected.Democratic hold.
| nowrap | 

|-
! 
| Charles A. Eldredge
|  | Democratic
| 1862
|  | Incumbent lost renomination.New member elected.Democratic hold.
| nowrap | 

|-
! 
| Philetus Sawyer
|  | Republican
| 1864
|  | Incumbent retired.new member elected. Republican hold.
| nowrap | 

|-
! 
| Jeremiah McLain Rusk
|  | Republican
| 1870
| Incumbent re-elected.
| nowrap | 

|-
! 
| Alexander S. McDill
|  | Republican
| 1872
| |  Incumbent lost re-election.New member elected.Democratic gain.
| nowrap | 

|}

Wyoming Territory 
See Non-voting delegates, below.

Non-voting delegates 

|-
! 

|-
! 
| Moses K. Armstrong
|  | Democratic
| 1870
|  | Incumbent lost re-election.New member elected.Republican gain.
| nowrap | 

|-
! 
| Jerome B. Chaffee
|  | Republican
| 1870
|  | Incumbent retired.New member elected.Democratic gain.
| nowrap | 

|-
! 
| John Hailey
|  | Democratic
| 1872
|  | Incumbent retired.New member elected.Independent gain.Result successfully contested.Democratic hold.
| nowrap | 

|-
! 
| Martin Maginnis
|  | Democratic
| 1872
| Incumbent re-elected.
| nowrap | 

|-
! 

|-
! 

|-
! 

|-
! 
| William R. Steele
|  | Democratic
| 1872
| Incumbent re-elected.
| nowrap | 

|}

See also
 1874 United States elections
 1874–75 United States Senate elections
 43rd United States Congress
 44th United States Congress

Notes

References

Bibliography

External links
 Office of the Historian (Office of Art & Archives, Office of the Clerk, U.S. House of Representatives)